Timandra comptaria is a moth of the family Geometridae first described by Francis Walker in 1862. It is found in Sri Lanka, Japan and Taiwan.

It is a pale brownish moth with a characteristic dark brown strip which runs from the apex of the forewing to the discal margin and then runs through middle of the hindwings. When at rest, this dark line appears as an unbroken line which runs through both forewings.

References

Moths of Asia
Moths described in 1862
Geometridae